Mutale Local Municipality was a municipality located in the Vhembe District Municipality of Limpopo province, South Africa. The seat of Mutale Local Municipality was Mutale. It is now part of Thulamela and Musina Local Municipalities.

Main places
The 2001 census divided the municipality into the following main places:

Politics 
The municipal council consisted of twenty-six members elected by mixed-member proportional representation. Thirteen councillors were elected by first-past-the-post voting in thirteen wards, while the remaining thirteen were chosen from party lists so that the total number of party representatives was proportional to the number of votes received. In the election of 18 May 2011 the African National Congress (ANC) won a majority of twenty-three seats on the council.
The following table shows the results of the election.

References

External links 
 Official homepage

Local municipalities of the Vhembe District Municipality